Dodge County is a county located in the U.S. state of Wisconsin. As of the 2020 census, the population was 89,396. Its county seat is Juneau. The county was created from the Wisconsin Territory in 1836 and organized in 1844.

Dodge County comprises the Beaver Dam, WI Micropolitan Statistical Area, which is included in the Milwaukee-Racine-Waukesha, WI Combined Statistical Area.

Geography

The 6,718 acre Beaver Dam Lake and the 2,713 acre Fox Lake are found within the county.

Adjacent counties
 Fond du Lac County – northeast
 Washington County – east
 Waukesha County – southeast
 Jefferson County – south
 Dane County – southwest
 Columbia County – west
 Green Lake County – northwest

National protected area
 Horicon National Wildlife Refuge (part)

Climate

Demographics

2020 census
As of the census of 2020, the population was 89,396. The racial makeup of the county was 88.8% White, 3.1% Black or African American, 0.6% Asian, 0.5% Native American, 2.4% from other races, and 4.6% from two or more races. Ethnically, the population was 6.1% Hispanic or Latino of any race.

2000 census
As of the census of 2000, there were 85,897 people, 31,417 households, and 22,313 families residing in the county. The population density was 97 people per square mile (38/km2). There were 33,672 housing units at an average density of 38 per square mile (15/km2). The racial makeup of the county was 95.28% White, 2.49% Black or African American, 0.40% Native American, 0.34% Asian, 0.03% Pacific Islander, 0.87% from other races, and 0.58% from two or more races. 2.55% of the population were Hispanic or Latino of any race. Ancestry, 56.2% were of German, 8.7% Irish and 5.0% English 4.2% Norwegian and 3.9% selected "United States or American" ancestry. 95.4% spoke English, 2.2% Spanish and 2.0% other Indo-European languages as their language spoken at home.

There were 31,417 households, out of which 33.90% had children under the age of 18 living with them, 59.60% were married couples living together, 7.50% had a female householder with no husband present, and 29.00% were non-families. 24.10% of all households were made up of individuals, and 10.80% had someone living alone who was 65 years of age or older. The average household size was 2.56 and the average family size was 3.05.

In the county, the population was spread out, with 24.80% under the age of 18, 8.30% from 18 to 24, 31.20% from 25 to 44, 21.90% from 45 to 64, and 14.00% who were 65 years of age or older. The median age was 37 years. For every 100 females there were 109.70 males. For every 100 females age 18 and over, there were 110.80 males.

In 2017, there were 758 births, giving a general fertility rate of 54.0 births per 1000 women aged 15–44, the 12th lowest rate out of all 72 Wisconsin counties.

Transportation

Major highways

  Interstate 41
  U.S. Highway 41
  U.S. Highway 151
  Highway 16
  Highway 19
  Highway 26
  Highway 28
  Highway 33
  Highway 49
  Highway 60
  Highway 67
  Highway 68
  Highway 73
  Highway 89
  Highway 175

Railroads
Canadian National
Canadian Pacific
Union Pacific
Wisconsin and Southern Railroad

Buses
List of intercity bus stops in Wisconsin

Airport
 Dodge County Airport (KUNU) serves the county and surrounding communities.

Communities

Cities

 Beaver Dam 
 Columbus (mostly in Columbia County)
 Fox Lake
 Hartford (part; mostly in Washington County)
 Horicon
 Juneau (county seat)
 Mayville
 Watertown (mostly in Jefferson County)
 Waupun (partly in Fond du Lac County)

Villages

 Brownsville
 Clyman
 Hustisford
 Iron Ridge
 Kekoskee
 Lomira
 Lowell
 Neosho
 Randolph (partly in Columbia County)
 Reeseville
 Theresa

Towns

 Ashippun
 Beaver Dam
 Burnett
 Calamus
 Chester
 Clyman
 Elba
 Emmet
 Fox Lake
 Herman
 Hubbard
 Hustisford
 Lebanon
 LeRoy
 Lomira
 Lowell
 Oak Grove
 Portland
 Rubicon
 Shields
 Theresa
 Trenton
 Westford
 Williamstown

Census-designated places
 Ashippun
 Burnett
 Lebanon

Unincorporated communities

 Alderley
 Astico
 Atwater
 Beaver Edge
 Clyman Junction
 Danville
 Delbern Acres
 East Waupun
 Farmersville
 Fox Lake Junction
 Herman Center
 Hochheim
 Huilsburg
 Knowles
 LeRoy
 Leipsig
 Lost Lake
 Lyndon Dale
 Minnesota Junction
 Nasbro
 Neda
 North Lowell
 Oak Grove
 Old Ashippun
 Old Lebanon
 Portland (partial)
 Richwood
 Rolling Prairie
 Rubicon
 Saylesville
 South Beaver Dam
 South Randolph
 Sugar Island
 Sunset Beach
 Theresa Station
 Woodland

Ghost town
 Clason Prairie

Gallery

Politics
The last Democratic presidential candidate to carry the county was Lyndon B. Johnson in 1964, but Bill Clinton came within just 265 votes of carrying it in 1996.

See also
 National Register of Historic Places listings in Dodge County, Wisconsin

References

Further reading
 Hubbell, Homer Bishop. Dodge County, Wisconsin: Past and Present. Chicago: S. J. Clarke, 1913.

External links
 Dodge County official website
 Dodge County map from the Wisconsin Department of Transportation
 Dodge County Tourism Association

 
1844 establishments in Wisconsin Territory
Populated places established in 1844